Keeper of the City is a 1992 American made-for-television crime-action film  directed  by Bobby Roth and  starring Louis Gossett Jr., Anthony LaPaglia and Peter Coyote. It originally premiered on Showtime on January 25, 1992.

Plot

Cast
Louis Gossett Jr. as Detective James Dela  
Anthony LaPaglia as Vince Benedetto
Peter Coyote as Frank Nordhall
Renée Soutendijk as Vickie Benedetto 
Tony Todd as Bridger 
Barbara Williams as Grace 
Richard Riehle as Captain Walder 
John Putch as  Mitch 
Gina Gallego as Elena
Tony Plana as Killer

References

External links

1992 television films
1992 films
1990s crime action films
American crime action films
Films scored by Leonard Rosenman
Films directed by Bobby Roth
Showtime (TV network) films
1990s English-language films
1990s American films